Hilton Lee Smith (February 27, 1907 – November 18, 1983) was an American right-handed pitcher in Negro league baseball. He pitched alongside Satchel Paige for the Kansas City Monarchs between 1932 and 1948. He was inducted into the National Baseball Hall of Fame in 2001.

Early life 
Born in Giddings, Texas, Smith began his career in black baseball's equivalent of the minor leagues with the Austin Black Senators in Austin, Texas. Smith made the dean's list as a student at Prairie View A&M College in 1928 and 1929. He was an outfielder in his first college season and a pitcher in his second year.

His big league debut was with the Monroe Monarchs of Monroe, Louisiana in 1932. In 1934, Smith wed Louise Humphrey. They had two children.

Semi-pro career 
From 1935 to 1936, Smith pitched for the Bismarck semi-professional team organized by Neil Churchill. In 1935 his teammates included Satchel Paige, Ted "Double Duty" Radcliffe, Quincy Trouppe, Barney Morris, and Chet Brewer. In August, the team won the national semipro championship in Wichita, Kansas.  In 1936, Paige, Radcliffe, and Brewer departed and Smith became the ace of the Bismarck team.  They returned to the national championship, where Smith won four games, but Bismarck failed to repeat as champions.

Negro league career 
In late 1936, Smith signed with the Kansas City Monarchs. From 1937 until his retirement in 1948, Smith was a star pitcher on the Monarchs. He possessed an outstanding curveball, but was overshadowed by his more flamboyant teammate Satchel Paige. Often Paige would pitch the first three innings of a game, leaving Smith to pitch the remaining six. Also, unlike Paige, Smith was a very good hitter.

Post-playing career and death 
After retiring from baseball, Smith worked as a schoolteacher and later as a steel plant foreman. He also scouted for the Chicago Cubs. Smith had a quiet, reserved temperament, but in his later years he stood up for Negro leaguers in their struggle to be inducted into the Baseball Hall of Fame. He died in 1983 in Kansas City, Missouri. It was not until 2001 that he was posthumously inducted into the Baseball Hall of Fame.

Notes

References

External links

 and Baseball-Reference Black Baseball and Mexican League stats and Seamheads
SABR BioProject

1907 births
1983 deaths
Algodoneros de Torreón players
American expatriate baseball players in Mexico
Baseball players from Texas
Bismarck Churchills players
Kansas City Monarchs players
Mexican League baseball pitchers
Monroe Monarchs players
National Baseball Hall of Fame inductees
New Orleans Crescent Stars players
Baseball players from Kansas City, Missouri
People from Giddings, Texas
Prairie View A&M Panthers baseball players
Tecolotes de Nuevo Laredo players
20th-century African-American sportspeople